Vellanikkara is a suburban area of Thrissur city of Kerala, south India. Its only 9 km from Swaraj Round. Kerala Agricultural University is located at Vellanikkara.

Cities and towns in Thrissur district